Neurogomphus pinheyi is a species of dragonfly in the family Gomphidae. It is found in Kenya and possibly the Democratic Republic of the Congo. Its natural habitats are subtropical or tropical moist lowland forests and rivers. It is threatened by habitat loss.

Sources

Gomphidae
Taxonomy articles created by Polbot
Insects described in 1968
Taxobox binomials not recognized by IUCN